Black Gold (also known as Day of the Falcon and Or noir) is a 2011 epic historical war film, based on Hans Ruesch's 1957 novel South of the Heart: A Novel of Modern Arabia (also known as The Great Thirst and The Arab). It was directed by Jean-Jacques Annaud, produced by Tarak Ben Ammar and co-produced by Doha Film Institute. The film stars Tahar Rahim, Antonio Banderas, Freida Pinto, Mark Strong and Riz Ahmed.

The film received negative reviews and grossed $5.5 million on a budget of $40 million, making it a box-office bomb.

Plot

In the early 20th century, Emir Nesib (Antonio Banderas), Sultan of Hobeika, and Sultan Amar (Mark Strong) of Salmaah have been in a border war over a vast barren strip they call "The Yellow Belt". When Nesib wins he forces Amar to agree to a peace pact: the Yellow Belt will belong to neither, becoming a no-man's-land between their territories, and Emir Nesib will take Sultan Amar's sons, Saleh and Auda, as hostages. Amar reluctantly agrees, knowing the hostages are a sacred trust which binds Nesib as well. They both swear to the pact before God. Nesib promises to rear Amar's sons with his own children, Tariq and Leyla.

Saleh, Amar's eldest son, is a free spirit interested in the traditional pursuits of an Arab emir, while Auda is an avid reader. Leyla and Auda become good friends, until they are separated at adolescence. Ten years pass. Auda (Tahar Rahim) is still a voracious reader, while Saleh (Akin Gazi) longs to go home and be with his father.

Sam Thurkettle (Corey Johnson), an American geologist working for the western "Texan Oil" company, surveys the Yellow Belt and is convinced there is high-grade crude oil under its shale. He tells Nesib that the find will make him richer than the King of England, and Nesib is more than willing to listen; he has had to watch, powerless and penniless, as his people suffered a cholera epidemic and his own wife died from it. Nesib allows Thurkettle's company to extract oil from the Yellow Belt – thus violating his peace pact with Sultan Amar.

Money pours in and Nesib starts to modernize his kingdom with schools, hospitals, and electricity. He makes his son Tariq a Colonel, appoints Auda his national librarian, and sends an envoy to Amar to strike a deal to extract oil from the Yellow Belt. But desert tribesmen attack one of the oil sites and kill the crew. Their revenues threatened, Nesib sets about inducing the various tribes to accept the oil extraction, using lavish gifts and gold as inducements.

The envoy sent to Amar returns and reports to Nesib: Amar considers the exploitation of Yellow Belt a violation of their treaty. Saleh tells Auda that he can convince their father and decides to escape; he kills his guards while making his escape. He is caught, but Ibn Idris kills him in revenge for killing the guards, who were Ibn Idris's cousins.

Desperate to maintain the oil revenues, Nesib executes a brilliant political maneuver: he marries Auda to his daughter Leyla (Freida Pinto). At one stroke he has converted Auda's position from hostage to family member, thereby dissolving his pact with Amar and absolving himself from his religious oath. Auda reluctantly agrees, knowing it is a plot to prevent Amar from attacking Nesib. Nesib decides to send Auda to convince Amar into extracting oil from the yellow belt. Auda meets Amar, who is surprised to learn that Auda has come as a representative of Nesib. Auda learns more about his father during his stay there. Amar tells Auda that Nesib offered 5%, then 35% of the earnings but he refused the offer. Nesib has even promised to give back Amar's sons as some kind of property value. When Auda tries to explain to him, he says that everything in his home is made either out of blood or love, but not money and that money has no value. The following day a meeting is held with Amar's allies. They say that by letting foreigners extract oil, they let themselves and their culture be destroyed. Auda unsuccessfully argues by saying if God had not meant for them to use it, he wouldn't have put it in their soil.

Amar sends an envoy, Hassan Dakhil, to Nesib offering to cease all hostilities if Nesib agrees to shut down the oil wells and expel the foreigners. Nesib refuses and makes a counter offer to Hassan Dakhil. Later Amar receives a message from Hassan that seemingly indicates that Hassan has defected to Nesib. Following this setback, Amar makes a plan to send all of his prisoners into the desert with weapon props to act as decoys, in order to lure Nesib's army into the desert by while Amar takes his real army to capture Nesib's city, Hobeika. He offers the leadership of the decoy army to Auda. Auda protests, objecting that to send the prisoners into the desert would mean certain death, but in the face of his father's disapproval he reluctantly agrees and ventures out, accompanied by his half brother Ali, a doctor, who does not seem to share their father's xenophobic mindset. The plan works and Nesib sends six armored cars after them. However the heavy cars are stuck in the sands and Auda's men are able to overpower their occupants, though not without heavy losses. The camel carrying the carrier pigeons is killed and the pigeons escape. One of them manages to make it way back to Salmaah. The blood on the pigeon along with the absence of a written message leads Amar to believe that there have been no survivors. When the armored cars fail to return, Nesib sends a plane with Tariq on board to reconnoiter. Auda sets another decoy, having his men lie down and play dead around a destroyed armored car. When Tariq lands to investigate, Auda's men swarm him. Tariq manages to make it back to the plane, but Auda's men force it down. Auda finds his body in the ensuing wreckage and is overcome with remorse at all the needless deaths. He rallies the remaining prisoners and offers to divide the remaining water between them and set them free. The prisoners decide to follow Auda, who leads them to the sea believing that they would find water there, based from what he had heard from a dying camel rider.

The army, now Auda's army, finally arrive at the sea but are disheartened to find no fresh water, until Ali finds an underwater spring. Having refilled their water skins, the army moves away and comes upon a Beni Sirri slaver tribe. Auda leads a small group of men to meet the Sheikh of Beni Sirri tribe and during the meeting the Sheikh beats Aicha (Liya Kebede), a slave girl, brutally. The Sheikh seemingly holds the slave's Zamiri tribe in derision as the Zamiri are one of the few tribes that allow women the same freedoms that are given to men. Auda tries to protest and offers to buy the slave girl in exchange for his mother's ring, who belonged to the same tribe as the slave girl. An argument ensues, and the Sheikh reveals that Nesib has already bought the loyalty of the Beni Sirri and that they intended to kill him in exchange of a reward. The rest of Auda's men launch a surprise attack, surrounding and overwhelming the Beni Sirri, leaving Auda to handcuff and disgrace the leaders of Beni Sirri tribe and freeing the slaves. To add insult to injury, Ali relieves the sheikh of the gold watch given to him by Nesib at Auda's wedding. In gratitude for freeing the slaves, the other tribes pledge their own resources to Auda. Aicha offers to lead Auda back to her own tribe in order to enlist their aid. However Auda is mistakenly shot by one of the tribe and seems to have been killed, only to revive in the middle of his own funeral rites. Ali realizes that Auda's condition had in fact been a medical phenomenon known as mors putativa in which a head trauma induces all the symptoms of death. However the tribals believe that Auda has been revived from death in the manner of the Islamic prophet Muhammad and that he is the leader foretold in the legends of the Zamiri tribe. Ali, despite knowing the true nature of Auda's injuries, does nothing to dissuade this notion. The Zamiri tribe now rallies around Auda as their leader. One of Nesib's planes manages to track them down and opens fire. The tribals manage to shoot down the plane, but not before it fatally wounds Ali. Auda administers his last rites as Ali lies dying in his arms. With his last breath Ali makes Auda promise to 'overturn the chessboard' in effect asking him to depose both Amar and Nessib, thereby putting an end to the conflict.

Auda rides with his army to the gates of Nessib's city. Amar arrives and meets Auda, who reveals that he has united all the other tribes and intends to keep the Yellow Belt for them. Amar reveals that Nesib has agreed to Amar's conditions and demands that Auda turn over his army to Amar. During the discussion, Amar is shot dead by the sheikh of the Beni Sirri tribe, who had in fact been aiming for Auda. Auda's army is outraged, believing that Nessib had double crossed them and tried to kill Auda during the negotiations. Nessib's army commander realizes that with Amar dead, there is nothing to stop Auda from attacking. As the shells rain down, Auda gives up any hope for talks and leads his army to sweep over Nessib's defenses. Though Nessib has superior weaponry, the combined might of all the tribes in Auda's army overwhelms them by sheer numbers.

Auda is knocked off his horse by a stray shell and beset upon by the Beni Sirri sheikh. The sheikh easily defeats him at close quarters combat and mocks him, asking whether Auda learned to fence 'in a library'. Just before the sheikh can land the killing blow, Aicha stabs him in the back and saves Auda. Learning about the developments, Nesib abdicates the throne in favor of his only remaining child, Leyla. Auda, through his marriage to Leyla is now ruler of both kingdoms. In the city, Auda's forces find Hassan in the dungeons, indicating that he had never betrayed Amar, but had instead been held prisoner by Nesib. Auda walks into the library where he finds Nesib, who compliments him on his achievements and asks what Auda intends to do. Auda replies that unlike his father, he does not dislike foreigners and that he believes that they have much to offer each other. On being questioned by Auda about what to do with Nessib, he admits that if he were in Auda's place he would have had him killed, quickly and painlessly. Auda instead opts to send him to Houston to sit on the Board of Directors of the oil companies, where he can protect the interests of their people. Auda offers him a backhanded compliment saying that 'he can't think of anyone more cunning' than Nesib to fill the role and that the oil company people 'deserve him'. The film ends with Auda calling off a meeting with several foreigners, presumably representatives of the oil companies, to be alone with his now-pregnant wife.

Cast

 Tahar Rahim as Prince Auda
 Antonio Banderas as Emir Nesib 
 Mark Strong as Sultan Amar 
 Freida Pinto as Princess Leyla
 Jan Uddin as Ibn Idriss
 Riz Ahmed as Dr Ali
 Corey Johnson as Thurkettle 
 Liya Kebede as Aicha
 Lotfi Dziri as Sheikh of Beni Sirri tribe
 Hichem Rostom as Nesib Colonel                  
 Mostafa Gaafar as Khoz Ahmed
 Jamal Awar as Companion Khoz Ahmed
 Driss Roukhe as Magroof
 Eriq Ebouaney as Hassan Dakhil
 Akin Gazi as Saleh
 Abdelmajid Lakhal as Old Imam

Reception
Black Gold was panned by critics. On Rotten Tomatoes, the film holds a rating of 11% based on 27 reviews, with an average score of 4 out of 10. While there was praise for its ambitious scope, production values and action, the film was criticized for being tedious and slow; Strong and Banderas received significant criticism for their performances as Arabic characters. "Touted as the Arab breakthrough into the international cinema arena, Black Gold pits Mark Strong and Antonio Banderas against each other as warring emirs torn between the traditional ways and modern temptations. But despite its honourable intentions, Black Gold hits the ground with a terrible clunking thud, its broken-English dialogue squeezing the life out of it practically from the off," The Guardian's Andrew Pulver wrote in his analysis.

References

External links
 
 
 

Qatari drama films
Tunisian drama films
Films directed by Jean-Jacques Annaud
2010s historical films
2011 war drama films
2011 films
French epic films
French historical films
French war drama films
Italian epic films
Italian historical films
Italian war drama films
Films set in deserts
Films set in the 1930s
Films set in the Middle East
Films shot in Tunisia
Films based on historical novels
Films based on Swiss novels
Films scored by James Horner
Historical epic films
War epic films
English-language French films
English-language Italian films
English-language Qatari films
English-language Tunisian films
Works about petroleum
Films about Islam
Films set in Asia
2011 drama films
2010s English-language films
2010s French films